Isaac Núñez (born 29 December 1999) is a Mexican artistic gymnast.

In 2019, he represented Mexico at the 2019 Pan American Games held in Lima, Peru and he won the gold medal in the men's parallel bars event.

References

External links 
 

Living people
1999 births
Place of birth missing (living people)
Mexican male artistic gymnasts
Gymnasts at the 2019 Pan American Games
Medalists at the 2019 Pan American Games
Pan American Games gold medalists for Mexico
Pan American Games medalists in gymnastics
21st-century Mexican people